Ed van Campen (born 1960, Los Angeles) is a former Dutch figure skater.

Results

References

External links
results

Navigation

1960 births
Living people
Dutch male single skaters
Figure skaters from Los Angeles